The Ploegsteert Memorial to the Missing is a Commonwealth War Graves Commission (CWGC) memorial in Belgium for missing soldiers of World War I. It commemorates men from the Allied Powers who fought on the northern Western Front outside the Ypres Salient and whose graves are unknown. The memorial is located in the village of Ploegsteert and stands in the middle of Berks Cemetery Extension.

History of the location
After Ploegsteert Wood (referred to colloquially as "Plug Street") had been the site of fierce fighting at the start of the war, it became a relatively quiet sector where no major action took place. Allied units were sent here to recuperate and retrain after fighting elsewhere and before returning to active operations. Berks Cemetery Extension was founded by Commonwealth troops in June 1916 as an extension to Hyde Park Corner (Royal Berks) Cemetery which lies across the road. The cemetery grounds were assigned to the United Kingdom in perpetuity by King Albert I of Belgium in recognition of the sacrifices made by the British Empire in the defence and liberation of Belgium during the war.

Memorial to the Missing 
The Ploegsteert Memorial to the Missing is one of several CWGC Memorials to the Missing along the Western Front: those lost within the Ypres Salient are commemorated at the Menin Gate and Tyne Cot Memorial to the Missing, while the missing of New Zealand and Newfoundland are honoured on separate memorials. The Ploegsteert Memorial was designed by H Chalton Bradshaw, who also designed the Cambrai Memorial in France, apart from two large lions which were commissioned from the sculptor Gilbert Ledward.

The Ploegsteert Memorial lists over 11,000 missing Commonwealth soldiers from the following battles, which were fought outside the Ypres Salient in the area around Ploegsteert:
 Armentieres
 Aubers Ridge
 Loos
 Fromelles
 Estaires
 Hazebrouck (part of the Battle of the Lys)
 Scherpenberg (part of the Battle of the Lys)
 Outtersteene Ridge (known as the 'Action of Outtersteene Ridge', 18 August 1918)

The memorial also commemorates the names of three recipients of the Victoria Cross who have no known grave:
 Sapper William Hackett VC
 Private James MacKenzie VC 
 Captain Thomas Pryce VC

"The Last Post"
Since 7 June 1999, the Comité du Memorial de Ploegsteert has arranged for the Last Post to be played at the memorial on the first Friday of each month.

Gallery

See also
 List of World War I memorials and cemeteries in Flanders

References

External links

 Ploegsteert Memorial at Find a Grave
 Silent Cities

Commonwealth War Graves Commission memorials
World War I memorials in Belgium
Ypres Salient
Buildings and structures in Hainaut (province)
Comines-Warneton